Manitius is a surname. Notable people by that name include:

 Max Manitius (1858–1933), German medievalist and Latin scholar
 Karl Manitius (1899–1979), German historian